Gomel Province or Homiel Province may refer to one of the following: 

Gomel Region of Belarus or Byelorussian SSR
Gomel Governorate of Russian Empire and RSFSR